The Allamoore Independent School District was a public school district based in the community of Allamoore, Texas, United States. The approximately  district was known as the Allamoore Consolidated Independent  District prior to 1992.

History
The one room schoolhouse was built circa 1910. In previous eras the school had two teachers and in later eras there was only one teacher who also did all administrative functions. Enrollment was determined by a fluctuating number of employees in area ranches. In portions of the 1950s and 1960s the district hired a teacher to be at the school, but there were no students to teach. In 1988, Allamoore's total enrollment was eight students, which made it one of the smallest school districts in the state of Texas. In 1990 that figure was down to three, cousins of one another, with one of the students being the daughter of the teacher.  By 1995 the student population was still three.

On July 1, 1995, Allamoore ISD consolidated with the Culberson County Independent School District based in nearby Van Horn to form the Culberson County-Allamoore Independent School District.

Operations
In 1990 the teacher/administrator reported that lesson planning took a lot of work as the students were not of the same ages.

District enrollment (1988-1995)
1988-89 – 3 students
1989-90 – 3 students
1990-91 – 2 students
1991-92 – 2 students
1992-93 – 8 students
1993-94 – 3 students
1994-95 – 3 students

See also
 Divide Independent School District - Commonly described as a one room schoolhouse
 Juno Common School District - Former one room schoolhouse

References

Former school districts in Texas
School districts in Hudspeth County, Texas
School districts disestablished in 1995
1995 disestablishments in Texas
One-room schoolhouses in the United States